The Waylanders is a role-playing video game developed by Spanish team Gato Studio.  It was released in early access for Microsoft Windows on June 16, 2020, with the full version of the game released on February 2, 2022. The game is played from a third-person perspective that can be shifted to a top-down perspective.

Gameplay
The Waylanders is a role-playing video game played from a third-person perspective and isometric camera view. It is a real-time combat game with tactical pause option. The battle mode has 12 different combat formations.

Set in the mythological kingdom of Kaltia (based on Galicia, mixing Galician and Celtic mythology), the game puts the player in the role of a warrior, guardian, explorer, mage, healer or rogue coming from a human, Mouro, Fomorian or werewolf background. In addition to choosing the character's class and race, players can mark their origin by choosing from a Celtic soldier, Celtic druid, Egyptian, Moure diplomat, Moure protector, Ares hound mercenary, alpha wolf, and slave. Throughout the game, players encounter various companions, who play major roles in the game's plot and gameplay.

Development

The Waylanders is developed by Spanish developer Gato Studio. The game is inspired by Baldur's Gate and Dragon Age: Origins. It was released on Steam Early Access in Q2 2020. The full version of the game was released on February 2, 2022.

Reception 

The Waylanders received mostly "mixed" and "negative" reviews from professional media, according to review aggregator Metacritic. Metacritic listed The Waylanders as the eight-worst game of 2022. Rock, Paper, Shotgun depicted the game as "endearing as it is janky" expecting "more patches can get rid of the (potentially game-breaking) bugs".

References

External links
 

Early access video games
2021 video games
Windows games
Windows-only games
Role-playing video games
Video games developed in Spain  
Fantasy video games
Single-player video games
Video games scored by Inon Zur